Rudolph Theodorus Baron van Pallandt van Eerde (28 November 1868 – 15 March 1913) was a Dutch sport shooter who competed at the 1908 Summer Olympics.

He was born in Oldebroek and died in London, Great Britain. In 1908 he finished fourth with the Dutch team in the team trap shooting event.

References

External links
list of Dutch shooters

1868 births
1913 deaths
People from Oldebroek
Dutch male sport shooters
Olympic shooters of the Netherlands
Shooters at the 1908 Summer Olympics
Trap and double trap shooters
Sportspeople from Gelderland